The 44th Indian Armoured Division was an armoured division of the Indian Army during World War II. It was formed in Burma, in February 1943, from the 32nd and 43rd Armoured divisions. It was reformed as the 21st Infantry Division in April 1944.

Formation

254th Indian Tank Brigade
7th Light Cavalry
25th Dragoons
46th Cavalry
45th Cavalry
3rd Carabiniers
149th Regiment, Royal Armoured Corps (RAC) raised from a Battalion of the King's Own Yorkshire Light Infantry
150th Regiment, RAC raised from 10th Bn York and Lancaster Regiment

255th Indian Armoured Brigade
26th Hussars
45th Cavalry
4/4th Bombay Grenadiers
158th Regiment, RAC
159th Regiment, RAC
5th King Edward's Own Probyn's Horse
9th Royal Deccan Horse
116th Regiment, RAC
19th King George's Own Lancers

268th Indian Infantry Brigade
converted from 268th Indian Armoured Brigade August 1945
8/13th Frontier Force Rifles
17/10th Baluch Regiment
17/7th Rajput Regiment
2/4th Bombay Grenadiers
5/4th Bombay Grenadiers
1st Assam Regiment
1st The Chamar Regiment
4/3rd Madras Regiment
Kalibahadur Regiment, Nepal
Mahindra Dal Regiment, Nepal
1/3rd Madras Regiment
2nd The King's Own Scottish Borderers
2nd The South Lancashire Regiment

Divisional troops
19th King George's Own Lancers

References

Indian World War II divisions
British Indian Army divisions
Military units and formations established in 1943
Military units and formations of the British Empire in World War II